Khōst is the capital of Khost Province in Afghanistan. It is the largest city in the southeastern part of the country, and also the largest in the region of Loya Paktia. To the south and east of Khost lie Waziristan and Kurram in Pakistan. Khost is the home of Shaikh Zayed University. Khost Airport serves the city as well as the larger region surrounding the city.

Geography

Khost is located about 150 kilometres south of Kabul. Khost lies on a plateau of minimally  altitude that extends to the East for about  until the Pakistan border. Thirty km to the North the peaks rise up to  while farther South  near the border, the average is around 1,800 m.

Climate
Khost has a semi-arid climate (Köppen BSk though very close to qualifying as BSh). Khost is located in the "Khost Bowl", a valley with lower elevation than the surrounding highlands. The geography afforded more moderate weather conditions. Nonetheless, frosts are still frequent in the early mornings.

The valley being open to the southeast (towards the lower elevation Miranshah), the moisture-laden winds bring much welcomed rain during the summer. The remaining portion of the year Khost remains hot and dry. Sporadic droughts occur when the summer monsoon fails to bring the needed precipitation.

Land use
Khost is the provincial administrative seat in eastern Afghanistan. Being close to the border with Pakistan, Khost straddles an important transport corridor. The eastern districts (1–3) are dotted with forests and residential settlements while the western districts (4–5) are more barren and lightly populated. Water courses account for 5% of total land surface.

History

Second Anglo-Afghan War 

During the Second Anglo-Afghan War, British forces led by Lord Roberts entered Khost during the second British invasion of Afghanistan during the conflict. Approximately 8,000 raiders from the Mangal tribe, which had a long tradition of resisting outside control, launched several attacks on weakly protected British supply convoys in Khost. In reprisal, Lord Roberts ordered his forces to attack eleven Mangal villages which had launched raids that murdered several camp followers, resulting in them being sacked and burnt. Once news of the reprisals became known in Britain, his political opponents in the British Parliament criticized Lord Robert's actions. At the end of the conflict, British forces withdrew from Khost.

Khost rebellions 

Between 1856 and 1925, Khost was the site of three rebellions, lasting from 1856 to 1857, 1912, and 1924–1925 respectively.

Soviet–Afghan War

During the Soviet-Afghan War, Khost was the object of a siege that lasted for more than eight years. Soon after the invasion of Afghanistan by Soviet troops, Afghan guerillas took control of the only land route between Khost and Gardez, effectively putting a stop to the Soviet advance.

During the assault on the Zhawar Kili Cave complex, the Soviets used the Khost Airfield as an initial staging ground to insert troops into the combat zone, using Mil Mi-8 armed helicopter transport ships.

Civil war
As of April 1995, Khost was under the control of the Taliban.

21st century

During the war in Afghanistan (2001–2021), the United States built Forward Operating Base Chapman near Khost. Due to its location in southeastern Afghanistan, it was a hotbed for insurgent activity attempting to dislodge the American forces there. Like most other provinces, Khost is home to maneuver forces and a Provincial Reconstruction Team (PRT). Maneuver forces wage war against insurgents and assist the Afghan National Army and the Afghan National Police in operations, while the PRT handles the reconstruction aspects.

In early 2007, Lieutenant Colonel Scottie Custer of the 82nd Airborne Division saw that the best way to limit insurgent activity in Khost was to forward-deploy some 187 paratroopers under his command to Force Protection Facilities in Khost's various district centers around sub-governors' mansions, to directly protect these, maintain a visible presence in population centers, and help mentor Afghan National Army and Afghan National Police units operating across Khost.

The FPFs brought a broader sense of security and prosperity to surrounding areas. Bazaars, shops, and gas stations have improved the quality of life for local residents. The Mandozai Force Protection Facilities in Khost include a medical clinic attached to further assist Afghans in need of basic medical assistance. The offices of Khost's various sub-governors had experienced an increased activity as Afghans went there to settle disputes and voice concerns instead of going through traditional tribal channels and bribes, cutting down on sectarian suspicion and strife.

Throughout 2007 and 2008, roads had been improved, businesses were springing up and schools were being built, at least 50 in 2007 alone with another 25 planned for 2008. A new airport was under construction as the Khost Airfield was used by the US Military, creating new opportunities and jobs. The Provincial Reconstruction Team, led by CDR David Adams was instrumental in connecting the people to the government in Khost City, by ensuring the PRT was able to execute over $2.5 million under the Commanders Emergency Response Program (CERP).

On 12 May 2009, several teams of armed militants stormed Khost, prompting a heavy 6-hour battle with US and Afghan National Army forces. Reportedly the attack involved 10 suicide bombers, of whom seven were able to detonate and three were shot by security forces. Coalition Forces, aided by the Afghan National Army and Afghan National Police, took the lead in repelling the attack.

On 20 November 2009 a bomb killed 3 civilians and wounded 3 others as a car hit a roadside bomb in Khost City. According to the chief of criminal investigation the act was perpetrated by the Taliban.

On 24 November 2009, according to the Afghan Ministry of Interior, 6 people, including 5 children were killed when a remote control bomb attacked a water station in Khost which had been built by the Rural Rehabilitation Ministry to distribute water to the locals.

On 30 December 2009, a suicide bomber attacked Forward Operating Base Chapman, a major CIA base in Khost, and killed seven CIA officers, including the chief of the base.

On 18 February 2011, a suicide car bomber targeted a police checkpoint and killed 11 people.

On 14 July 2011, according to a spokesman for the provincial government, NATO ground troops killed six civilians in a night raid of the village of Toora Worai, in an area known as Matoon, about seven kilometres from the Khost provincial capital of Khost city.

On 15 August 2021, Khost was seized by Taliban fighters, becoming the twenty-eighth provincial capital to be captured by the Taliban as part of the wider 2021 Taliban offensive.

At least 29 people died in Khost during the June 2022 Afghanistan earthquake.

Demographics

The urban population of the city of Khost is 106,083 (in 2015), mostly Pashtun (mainly from the tribes of Zadran, Mangal, Zazi, Tani, Gurbuz, Muqbal, Sabari, and Wazir), living in 11,787 dwellings, arranged in six municipal districts.

Khost has a population of 511,600 people in 2008. In the province, there are 87,199 households, with an average of eight individuals per home. Rural districts are home to 98 percent of the population. Pashtuns are the province's most populous ethnic group. Zadran, Mangal, Mandozi, Ismaiel Khil, Tani, Gubuz, Matoon, Lakan, Jaji, Sabari, Alishir Terizi, and Babakker Khil are among the prominent tribes. There is a small population of Pamiris as well. Kuchis (nomads) live in Khost province, and their numbers fluctuate depending on the season. 75 percent of the 104,965 Kuchis living in Khost are long-distance migratory, while 25% are settled. Over half of the colony of long-distance migratory Kuchis migrates from a winter to a summer location. In the winter, an estimated 74,179 people cross the border, bringing Khost's Kuchi population to 179,144, making it the country's second-largest Kuchi province (after Nangarhar).

Sport

Cricket is growing in popularity in Khost, with the sport being introduced by newly returned refugees from Pakistan. Afghanistan spinner Mujeeb Ur Rahman, and batsman Noor Ali, as well as Nawroz Mangal, the former captain of Afghanistan Cricket Team hail from Khost. Dawlat Zadran, the Afghan Cricket paceman who grabbed two crucial wickets against Pakistan (in 1st International One Day against Full Member), is also from Khost.

In football, Khost and the surrounding region is represented by De Abasin Sape F.C, in the Afghan Premier League.

Professional sports teams from Khost

Stadiums
 Khost Cricket Stadium, constructed with financial support from Germany. The inauguration of the stadium also included an exhibitory match which witnessed a record crowd for any sport played in Afghanistan.
 Khost City Ground, a multi-purpose stadium in Khost for football and other sports.

Notable Sport Players 
 Nawroz Mangal
 Noor Ali Zadran
 Mujeeb Zadran
 Rahmanullah Gurbaz
 Fazal Niazai
 Ibrahim Zadran
 Dawlat Zadran

See also
 List of cities in Afghanistan
 Valleys of Afghanistan

Notes

References 
 Blowback: The Costs and Consequences of American Empire, by Chalmers Johnson,

External links

 
 , February 11, 2018, Independent Directorate of local Governance (IDLG).
 Official website of Khost (Pashto)

 
Cities in Afghanistan
Populated places in Khost Province
Provincial capitals in Afghanistan
Populated places with period of establishment missing